Surukot is a place in Jammu and Kashmir.

References

External links

Jammu and Kashmir